Oscar Hugh La Grange (April 3, 1837January 5, 1915) was an American lawyer and abolitionist activist.  He served as a Union Army officer in the American Civil War, and received an honorary brevet to brigadier general.

Biography
Oscar Hugh La Grange was born on April 3, 1837, in Fulton, Oswego County, New York. In 1845, he and his family moved to Ripon, Wisconsin. He attended Ripon College and the University of Wisconsin in Madison.

La Grange became an active abolitionist, participating in the Bleeding Kansas conflicts and helping to free Sherman Booth from jail. After his military career, he became superintendent of the San Francisco Mint.

Oscar La Grange died of pneumonia on January 5, 1915, in New York City.

Military career
After the outbreak of the American Civil War in 1861, La Grange joined the Army and was assigned to the 4th Wisconsin Infantry Regiment. Later that year, he transferred to the 1st Wisconsin Cavalry Regiment. In 1863, La Grange became a brigade commander in the Army of the Cumberland under the command of future U.S. Representative William Rosecrans. He later took part in the Battle of Chickamauga. In 1864, La Grange was serving in the Battle of Rocky Face Ridge when he was taken prisoner by Joseph Wheeler.

He was exchanged after three months. Returning to action, La Grange and his brigade played a vital role in the Battle of West Point.  After this victory, LaGrange's troopers moved east toward LaGrange, Georgia, where they were met by a group of armed women who called themselves the Nancy Harts. After Colonel La Grange assured the women that he would not destroy private property, they backed down and disarmed.  

La Grange was mustered out of the volunteers on July 19, 1865. On January 13, 1866, President Andrew Johnson nominated La Grange for appointment to the grade of brevet brigadier general of volunteers to rank from March 13, 1865, and the United States Senate confirmed the appointment on March 12, 1866.

References

External links
 La Grange, Col. Oscar H., 1837-1915 at Wisconsin Historical Society

People from Oswego County, New York
People of Wisconsin in the American Civil War
Union Army colonels
American abolitionists
Ripon College (Wisconsin) alumni
University of Wisconsin–Madison alumni
1837 births
1915 deaths
Deaths from pneumonia in New York City
People from Ripon, Wisconsin
American Civil War prisoners of war